Minella is a surname. Notable people with the surname include:

 Angiola Minella (1920–1988), Italian politician
 José María Minella (1909–1981), Argentine football player and manager
 Lani Minella (born 1950), American voice actress, voice director, and producer
 Mandy Minella (born 1985), Luxembourgish professional tennis player

See also
 Minella Indo, Irish racehorse 
 Minella Times, Irish-bred Thoroughbred racehorse 
 Minella bianca, variety of grape

Italian-language surnames